Super Rugby Americas (SRA) will be the new franchise rugby tournament format in Americas, and the first season will begin on February 18, 2023 after efforts by World Rugby.​ It will be organized and led by Sudamérica Rugby, the highest rugby entity in South America.

The tournament will include seven teams through franchises. The holding of this tournament in the Americas has the precedent of the extinct Superliga Americana de Rugby (SLAR) ), a precursor competition.

The name Super Rugby Americas was proposed by World Rugby to draw a parallel with Super Rugby Pacific, a competition made up of franchises from Australia, Fiji and New Zealand.

History

SLAR (2020-2022) 

SLAR was first announced in April 2019, with plans of forming between six and eight professional franchises, two each in Uruguay and Brazil, meanwhile Argentina and Chile were to get a franchise each with plans to add two teams in 2021 with an additional team in Argentina and one from Paraguay. In November, SLAR's plans changed to a league of seven clubs, two each in Brazil and Uruguay with one team each in Argentina, Chile, and Paraguay. Officially sanctioned by Sudamérica Rugby, which is consequently part of World Rugby, the league was officially launched in November 29, 2019.

At the official announcement, SLAR confirmed the number of the teams for the 2020 season was be at five for the regular season due to the economic issues but SLAR
was expected to be expanded at some point in the future, possibly in 2021. Cafeteros Pro (Colombia)  joined at the end of the regular season to play a home and away series against the 5th-place finisher in the 2020 season before joining the league full-time.

The tournament could be played without problems in 2021 and 2022. During 2022, there were already ideas to carry out a joint competition between the franchises that contested the SLAR and teams from North America. During the season, the Challenge Cup of the Americas, a friendly rugby cup, was played on an experimental way.

SRA (2023-Present) 
As it is a competition with franchises, the impact of the SLAR was in doubt. According to South American specialists, the success achieved by the tournament was relative but after various requests from institutions to join and participate in a larger tournament, World Rugby requested the expansion of the format towards a more ambitious and regional competition.

Once the news was released, Wenceslao Tejerina, High Performance Manager for Chile, announced that they were working on a new tournament. After the announcement of the new contest, the Uruguayan Sebastián Piñeyrúa, director of the South American entity, issued the following statement: "Due to the success obtained in the American Rugby Super League in the two full seasons of 2021 and 2022, from South America Rugby, SLAR organizers, we are in the middle of negotiations with national unions in North and Central America, to plan the future growth of Rugby in the continent, for this reason, we are working with all the member unions and franchises participating in SLAR 2022, to plan and develop future competitions, by franchises and international. On October 27, the format will be presented and details of the new professional competition of the Americas will be given".

In this way, after efforts by South America Rugby and World Rugby, the emergence of Super Rugby Americas was announced in October 2022, a tournament that will also be organized by USA Rugby and Rugby Canada, which will include most of the clubs that competed in SLAR 2022 with the addition of franchises from the United States and Canada.

According to the High Performance Manager of South America Rugby, Daniel Hourcade, the Unión Argentina de Rugby will also incorporate more franchises in the next editions of the new league.

Competition format 
In 2020, Superliga Americana de Rugby was to span four months from February through May. For the first season, five of the six clubs Ceibos, Corinthians, Selknam, Olímpia Lions, and Peñarol planned to take part in a double round-robin regular season, playing twice against each other team, once at home and once away, for a total of eight games. The top four teams would qualify for the championship playoffs to determine a season champion. The fifth place regular season team would have played a series against Los Cafeteros Pro to determine the fifth-place team. However, on March 17, 2020, the season was postponed until 2021, as a result of the COVID-19 pandemic.

Like Super Rugby, Major League Rugby, and the United Rugby Championship, the Super Rugby Americas has no promotion and relegation.

Teams

Current teams
There are seven teams confirmed for the 2023 Super Rugby Americas season.

 Notes:

Timeline

Expansion teams
On 10 November 2020, Colombia has formalized professional rugby. The South American country’s first professional rugby team will be Cafeteros Pro. The team will enter the Súper Liga Americana de Rugby (SLAR) in 2021. On 6 January 2021, UAR replaced the Córdoba based team Ceibos with the Jaguares XV, following the Jaguares' departure from Super Rugby. On 4 February 2021, the Brazilian side of the competition was renamed Cobras Brasil XV, dropping their affiliation with the Corinthians multi-sport club.
On 13 December 2022 SLAR confirmed the replacement of Cafeteros Pro with the reintroduction of Córdoba based team Dogos XV, in the past Ceibos.
On 22 December 2022 Super Rugby Americas confirmed more news. First the came back of Argentine Pampas XV in substitution of Jaguares XV, second the participation of American Raptors, third the rebranded of Paraguayan team from Olimpia Lions to Yakarés XV in order to indicate that relationship between the Paraguayan Rugby Union and the soccer team Club Olimpia is ended.

Expansion candidates 
At the initial announcement, Brazil and Uruguay originally would have two team each, but instead one team each (Corinthians and Peñarol) will play in 2020 season, meaning it may be possible for the two countries to expand in the future (Club Nacional de Football was hinted as a possibility in Uruguay)  besides a possible Mexican team or a second Chilean team. With the possible change of Super Rugby to a Trans-Tasman (Australasian) competition, Argentina could add a second team, the Jaguares, based in Buenos Aires, in 2021. In November 2020, another new team proposed for 2021 with official expression of interest by Sudamérica Rugby for the inclusion of a second Argentine Buenos Aires based team in the 2021 SLAR, but a second Argentine team won't play in 2021 and most Argentine players will depart the team either overseas, or enter the draft for the 2021 Súper Liga Americana de Rugby season.
In August and September 2021 it was rumoured that a second Argentine franchise could join the competition in the future, based in  Tucumán, but this possible expansion was postponed to the 2023 season.
In October 2022 news confirm that Argentine Tucumán will replace Colombian team Cafeteros Pro and two North American franchises, Canadian Pacific Pride and U.S. American Raptors, are going to participate at this new tournament renamed Super Rugby Americas.

Former teams 

Notes

Champions

List of SLAR finals

List of SRA finals

See also 
 South American Rugby Championship
 Americas Rugby Championship
 Major League Rugby
 Super Rugby
 United Rugby Championship

References